Matías Sosa may refer to:

 Matías Sosa (footballer, born 1992), Argentine attacking midfielder
 Matías Sosa (footballer, born 1995), Argentine attacking midfielder
 Matías Sosa (footballer, born 2001), Argentine striker

See also
 Matías Ruiz Sosa (born 1992), Argentine attacking midfielder